Chaotic Beauty is the third album by Finnish symphonic death metal band Eternal Tears of Sorrow. It was their first album without the original three founding members of the band (guitarist Olli-Pekka Törrö had left the band in early 1999) and the first EToS album with a five-member line-up.

The guest vocalist on the album was Kimberly Goss of Sinergy, and Heli Luokkala on the Japanese bonus CD. The song "Black Tears" is a cover, originally written by Dan Swanö for his band Edge of Sanity.

This album continues the band's tradition to record albums with Ahti Kortelainen at Tico-Tico Studio in Kemi, Finland. However, this is the first EToS album that Mikko Karmila mixed; before Chaotic Beauty, all albums were also mixed by Ahti Kortelainen.

Track listing 

Japanese edition bonus tracks
 Flight of Icarus (Iron Maiden cover) – 4:14
 Coronach – 4:54
 Nightwind's Lullaby – 5:29
 Burning Flames' Embrace – 4:08

Personnel

Band members 
 Altti Veteläinen − vocals, bass
 Jarmo Puolakanaho − guitar
 Antti-Matti Talala − lead guitar
 Pasi Hiltula − keyboards
 Petri Sankala − drums

Guest appearances 
 Kimberly Goss − female vocals (on tracks 5 and 9), whispering (on track 3)
 Heli Luokkala − female vocals (on track 12, Japanese bonus CD)

References 

2000 albums
Eternal Tears of Sorrow albums